The County of Stanley is a cadastral division centred on the city of Brisbane in Queensland, Australia, that is used mainly for the purpose of registering land titles. It was named after Edward Stanley, who was three times British prime minister in the 1850s and 1860s. It is bounded by the Logan River in the south, the Brisbane River at what is now Lake Wivenhoe in the west, the Stanley River at what is now Lake Somerset in the north-west, and Caboolture River in the north. It includes Moreton Island and Stradbroke Island, and extends west to Ipswich's CBD, south to Loganlea and north to Morayfield.

History

Stanley was formerly a county in New South Wales between the establishment of Brisbane in 1826, and the formation of Queensland as a separate colony in 1859, and was officially established by proclamation on 27 February 1843. In 1852 it had a population of 2,000. Wheat, coffee, cotton and tobacco were described as being important crops. By 1863, the county had contracted to its present boundaries.

On 7 March 1901, the Governor of Queensland proclaimed new boundaries under the Land Act 1897, and Stanley was described as follows:

Parishes 
Stanley is divided into parishes, listed as follows:

See also
 Local government in Australia
 County

References

Stanley